St. Paul's Matriculation Higher Secondary School is a secondary school in Coimbatore, established in 1990.  Then the sole campus was at Bashyakaralu Street, RS Puram, Coimbatore - 641002.  In the first year, there were  pupils from LKG to 8th Standard.

References

St.Paul's Matriculation School  was founded in 1990, the year of literacy, by St.Paul's Educational Trust, with classes from L.K.G to VIII Std.  From the academic year 1994–95, it has become a full-fledged Matriculation & Higher Secondary School with classes from Pre K.G. to XII Std. 

"St.Paul's" is situated at Eden Garden with 11.35 acres of land, has buildings with hostel for boys and girls and a play ground.

St.Paul's, recognised by the Government of Tamil Nadu, is an English Medium, Co-educational School. Matriculation syllabus is followed with Tamil and Hindi as Second Languages. French is also taught as II Language in Hr. Sec. Classes.  To prepare the children for the existing Computer age, Computer Education is implemented to students of classes from I to XII with well equipped computer center, which has 62 computers and 8 printers with Internet, LAN and multimedia Facility.

External links

Primary schools in Tamil Nadu
High schools and secondary schools in Tamil Nadu
Schools in Coimbatore
Educational institutions established in 1990
1990 establishments in Tamil Nadu